Lekce tvůrčího psaní (The Creative Writing Lesson) is a Czech psychological novella, written by Michal Viewegh. It was first published in 2005. A Slovenian edition was published in 2010.

References

2005 Czech novels